Iridana bwamba is a butterfly in the family Lycaenidae. It is found in Uganda (from the western part of the country to the Bwamba Valley).

References

Endemic fauna of Uganda
Butterflies described in 1964
Poritiinae